Levin House is the name of several buildings:

Levin House (Copenhagen)
Levin House (Tel Aviv)
Robert and Rae Levin House, in Kalamazoo, Michigan, designed by Frank Lloyd Wright